Podalakur is a mandal in Nellore district in the state of Andhra Pradesh in India.

Geography
It has an average elevation of 43 meters (141 feet). The nearest railway station is in Vedayapalam which is located at a distance of 2.22 Km.

References 

Villages in Nellore district